This list of tallest buildings in North Carolina ranks skyscrapers in the U.S. state of North Carolina by height.

Tallest buildings 
This list ranks North Carolina skyscrapers that stand at least 200 feet (60.96 m) tall, based on standard height measurement. This includes spires and architectural details but does not include antenna masts or other objects not part of the original plans. Existing structures are included for ranking purposes based on present height.

Tallest under construction 
This lists buildings that are under construction in North Carolina and are planned to rise at least 200 ft (61 m). Buildings that have already been topped out are also included.  As of November 2022, there are 18 such buildings under construction.

Proposed and approved 
This lists buildings that are proposed, approved, or on hold in North Carolina that are planned to rise at least 200 ft (61 m).

See also 
List of tallest buildings in Charlotte
List of tallest buildings in Raleigh, North Carolina
List of tallest buildings in Winston-Salem
List of tallest buildings in the United States
List of tallest buildings by U.S. state

Notes

References 

North Carolina
Tallest